British rapper Wiley has released 15 studio albums and 29 singles.

Albums

Studio albums

Extended plays

Mixtapes

Instrumentals

Miscellaneous

With Roll Deep

With Boy Better Know

Singles

As lead artist

1Singles were on the original version of Snakes & Ladders which was scrapped
2Single released by Wiley's ex-label. Disowned by the artist.
3Also featured in the 2018 film Final Score

As featured artist

Other charted songs

Music videos

As lead artist

References

External links
 Wiley's page on Discogs which contains details of his collection of early career independent/white label vinyl releases.

Discographies of British artists
Hip hop discographies